Ruchi Trikha (born 1 March 1986) is an Indian epée fencing player. In July 2017, she was noted as the top women fencer in the Punjab region of India. Trikha competed at the Asian Games 2006. She was the first Indian to win two bronze medals at the Commonwealth Fencing Championship in 2006. Trikha won an individual gold medal and team gold medal at the 12th Thailand Open Asian Fencing Championship. She was coached by Arun Kumar Vij, secretary-general of the Fencing Association of India.

Early life 
She completed her higher education from Multani Mal Modi College, Patiala. She started fencing in 2003.

Honours and awards
In 2007, Trikha was recommended by the International Fencing Federation for the Arjuna Award after becoming the first Indian woman to win gold at an international competition.
In 2013, she was honored with the Maharaja Ranjit Singh Award.

References

External links
 Profile at International Fencing Federation

Living people
Indian female épée fencers
Fencers at the 2006 Asian Games
Place of birth missing (living people)
1986 births
Asian Games competitors for India